The black bottom is a dance which became popular during 1920s amid the Jazz Age. It was danced solo or by couples. Originating among African Americans in the rural South, the black bottom eventually spread to mainstream American culture and became a national craze in the 1920s. The dance was most famously performed by Ann Pennington, a star of the Ziegfeld Follies, who performed it in a Broadway revue staged by Ziegfeld's rival George White in 1926.

Origins

The dance originated in New Orleans in the first decade of the 20th century. Jazz pianist and composer Jelly Roll Morton wrote the tune "Black Bottom Stomp", its title referring to the Black Bottom area of Detroit.

Sheet music from the mid-20s identifies the composers as Gus Horsley and Perry Bradford and claims the dance was introduced by the African-American dancer and choreographer Billy Pierce. The sheet music's cover photograph features dancer Stella Doyle, who performed primarily in cabarets.

The black bottom was well known among semirural blacks across the South. A similar dance with many variations was commonly performed in tent shows, and "Bradford and Jeanette" had used it as a finale.

The dance was featured in the Harlem show Dinah in 1924 and was then performed by Ann Pennington and Tom Patricola in the musical comedy revue George White's Scandals of 1926 on Broadway, whereupon it became a national craze. The black bottom overtook the Charleston in popularity and eventually became the number one social dance. Some dance critics noted that by the time it became a fad in American society in the mid-20s, it resembled the Charleston. Both dances can be performed solo or as a couple and feature exuberant moves.

The African-American choreographer Billy Pierce, who is credited on "Black Bottom Dance" sheet music with having introduced the dance, was an associate of the African-American choreographer Buddy Bradley. Working out of Pierce's dance studio in New York City, Bradley devised dance routines for Tom Pericola and other Broadway performers.

A different musical accompaniment, composed by Ray Henderson with new lyrics from Buddy DeSylva and Lew Brown also briefly became a nationwide sensation and was widely recorded. A re-creation of that version by choreographer Rod Alexander was featured in the 1956 biopic The Best Things in Life Are Free performed by Sheree North and Jacques d’Amboise, leading a stage full of flappers and tuxedoed Johnnies.

Dance steps
The rhythm of the black bottom is based on the Charleston. Bradford's version, printed with the sheet music, gave these instructions:

Instructions for the mooch are "Shuffle forward with both feet. Hips go first, then feet."

Broadway historians Kantor and Maslon describe it as a ‘fairly simple step punctuated by a slap on the rear end’ with the hobbling step akin to pulling your feet out of the deep muddy waters of the Swanee. The Alexander recreation expanded this into having his dance partners cheekily bump their posteriors together; although there is no evidence to suggest that was part of the original dance.

Legacy
"Ma Rainey's Black Bottom", a 1920s blues song by Ma Rainey, makes obvious allusions to the dance but is not itself dance music. Ma Rainey's Black Bottom is also the title of a 1982 play by August Wilson, set around recording of the song. Wilson's play was adapted into a 2020 movie of the same name starring Viola Davis as Ma Rainey.

The comedy musician Spike Jones, who became popular in the 1940s, performed a jaunty cover of the black bottom. His version, released on 78-RPM records, repeated a single measure of a piano solo in the middle of the song several times, each time continuing with a loud "crack!" as a joke to make the record sound broken.

The dance was featured in the 1927 Austrian silent film Café Elektric.

Judy Garland repeats vocal refrains from the song while hoofing in some chorus girl lines in a montage sequence from A Star Is Born (1954).

References

External links

 Crazy Words--Crazy Tune (Vo-do-de-o) - This 1926 song uses "Black Bottom" as a theme.
 Walter Nelson on "The Black Bottom" (featuring clips of the dance)

Novelty and fad dances
Swing dances
African-American dance